Harpalus macronotus is a species of ground beetle in the subfamily Harpalinae. It was described by Tschitscherine in 1893.

References

macronotus
Beetles described in 1893